In grammar, a ligature is a morpheme that links two elements.

See also
Albanian morphology#The linking clitic
Ezāfe
Interfix
Miskito grammar#Ligature
Tagalog grammar#Ligature

Linguistic morphology
Grammar